Anthony Wallace Masciarelli (March 29, 1906 – July 12, 1999) was an American television producer.

Early life
Anthony "Tony" Masciarelli was of Italian descent, his family having come from San Martino sulla Marrucina, Chieti, Abruzzo. He changed his last name to Marshall before his son Garry was born. Marshall married Marjorie Irene (nee Ward; 1908–1983), the owner and teacher in a tap dance school.

Career
Marshall began his career as a director of manufacturing films and was a producer on his son Garry Marshall's television series, The Odd Couple. Later in his career, he produced for other television sitcoms, including, Laverne & Shirley, Happy Days, Mork & Mindy, Who's Watching the Kids? and The New Odd Couple. Marshall was also nominated for two Primetime Emmy Awards in the category Outstanding Comedy Series.

Death
Marshall died in July 1999 of natural causes at his home in Toluca Lake, Los Angeles, at the age of 93.

References

External links 

1906 births
1999 deaths
People from the Bronx
American television producers
New York University alumni